George Daley may refer to:
 George W. Daley (1875–1952), American newspaper editor, sports writer, and syndicated author of fictional baseball stories and poetry
 George Q. Daley, dean of Harvard Medical School

See also
George Daly (disambiguation)